The Hamburg-America Shipping Line Administrative Offices, also known as United States District Courts Building, in Charlotte Amalie in Saint Thomas, U.S. Virgin Islands, was built in 1914.  It was listed on the National Register of Historic Places in 1978.

It was built for the Hamburg-Amerikanische Packetfahrt Aktien Gesellschaft and held offices for the Superintendent Counsul and also for the Imperial German Consulate.  The German connection was lost when the U.S. purchased the Virgin Islands from Denmark just prior to joining World War I against Germany.

Designed by German architect Fritz Klein, it is one of the United States' earlier examples of Modern architecture.

In 1978 it housed the U.S. Immigration and Naturalization Service, the U.S. Marshal Service, and the U.S. District Court.

References

External links

National Register of Historic Places in the United States Virgin Islands
Buildings and structures completed in 1914
Courthouses in the United States
1914 establishments in North America
1910s establishments in the Caribbean
1914 establishments in Denmark
20th-century establishments in the Danish West Indies
Charlotte Amalie, U.S. Virgin Islands